The mountain cuscus (Phalanger carmelitae) is a species of marsupial in the family Phalangeridae found in West Papua, Indonesia and Papua New Guinea.

References

Possums
Mammals of Papua New Guinea
Mammals of Western New Guinea
Mammals described in 1898
Taxa named by Oldfield Thomas
Taxonomy articles created by Polbot
Marsupials of New Guinea